Aristide Wam (born 12 February 2002) is a Cameroonian professional footballer who plays as a midfielder for club Le Havre.

Club career 
He made his professional debut for Le Havre on the 15 May 2021, starting the Ligue 2 game against the league champions of  ESTAC Troyes.

References

External links

2002 births
Living people
Cameroonian footballers
Association football midfielders
People from Southwest Region (Cameroon)
Le Havre AC players
Ligue 2 players
Championnat National 3 players
Cameroonian expatriate footballers
Cameroonian expatriate sportspeople in France